Claire Johnstone (born 11 January 1982) is a Scottish football goalkeeper.

Club career
After playing for Doncaster Belles at Under–18 level, Johnstone moved to Scotland in February 2001, where she was signed for Kilmarnock by manager Jim Chapman.

In the 2004 summer season, Johnstone played in Iceland with ÍBV and made 13 Úrvalsdeild appearances. She returned to Iceland in 2007 to play 11 games for Þór/KA.

Johnstone and Suzanne Malone left Celtic for champions Glasgow City in June 2009. In October 2010 Johnstone played as a substitute striker due to an injury crisis and scored in Glasgow City's 16–0 win over Aberdeen.

Before the 2012 Scottish Women's Premier League season, Johnstone held transfer talks with Forfar Farmington. She played in a friendly match but the move broke down.

After a spell with Rangers, Johnstone joined Motherwell in 2018.

International career
Johnstone made her senior Scottish national team debut against Moldova in April 1999. For several years she was the national team's regular understudy to Gemma Fay.

References

External links
Killie FC profile
Glasgow City profile

1982 births
Living people
Footballers from Portsmouth
Scottish women's footballers
English women's footballers
Scotland women's international footballers
Glasgow City F.C. players
Doncaster Rovers Belles L.F.C. players
Celtic F.C. Women players
F.C. Kilmarnock Ladies players
Rangers W.F.C. players
Women's association football goalkeepers
Claire Johnstone
Claire Johnstone
Expatriate women's footballers in Iceland
Scottish expatriate sportspeople in Iceland
Scottish expatriate women's footballers
Claire Johnstone
Motherwell L.F.C. players
Anglo-Scots